Nelson Dock is a dock on the River Mersey, England, and part of the Port of Liverpool. It is situated in the northern dock system in Vauxhall, connected to Bramley-Moore Dock to the north and Salisbury Dock to the south.

History
The dock was designed by Jesse Hartley and opened in 1848.

In 2007, the Peel Group, owners of the Mersey Docks and Harbour Company, unveiled the £5.5 billion 'Liverpool Waters' regeneration programme. Nelson Dock is encompassed in the  site.

References

Sources

Further reading

External links
 
 Nelson Dock aerial photo

Grade II listed buildings in Liverpool
Liverpool docks